Sadhna pass, also known as Sadna Top and previously called Nastachun pass is a mountain pass in Jammu and Kashmir, India. It is located in the Himalayas and connects Karnah tehsil in the Kishanganga valley of Kupwara district with the Kashmir valley. It is approximately 30 km away from the town of Kupwara. The pass is best known for a mythological legend of Blind and Deaf Fairies, and for its association with Bollywood actress Sadhana.

Mountains of Jammu and Kashmir

References